The Allegheny County Mortuary located at 542 Fourth Avenue in downtown Pittsburgh, Pennsylvania, was built in 1903.  It was added to the List of City of Pittsburgh historic designations on September 26, 2002.

References

Government buildings in Pittsburgh
City of Pittsburgh historic designations
Frederick J. Osterling buildings
Buildings and structures completed in 1903
Romanesque Revival architecture in Pennsylvania
1903 establishments in Pennsylvania